Lucas Rual (born 25 April 1995) is a French sailor. He and Émile Amoros competed for France at the 2020 Summer Olympics in the 49er event.

References

External links
 
 

1995 births
Living people
French male sailors (sport)
Olympic sailors of France
Sailors at the 2020 Summer Olympics – 49er
Place of birth missing (living people)